The Revenue Tariff Party, also known as the Tariff Reform Party, was a minor Australian political party that operated in Tasmania in 1903. It elected one member, William McWilliams, to the House of Representatives, and one member, Henry Dobson, to the Senate in the 1903 federal election. Both joined the Free Trade Party soon after the election, and the party was not heard of again.

References

Defunct political parties in Tasmania
Political parties established in 1902
1902 establishments in Australia